Spruce Woods is a provincial electoral division in the Canadian province of Manitoba. It was created by redistribution in 2008 out of parts of Minnedosa and Turtle Mountain and notably gained parts of the City of Brandon and Arthur-Virden in the 2018 redistribution.

Following the 2018 redistribution, Spruce Woods includes the municipalities of Cornwallis, Elton, Glenboro – South Cypress, Oakland – Wawanesa, Riverdale, Sifton, Souris – Glenwood, Victoria, Whitehead and the portion of the City of Brandon located north of the Assiniboine River.

Outside of the City of Brandon, communities in the constituency include Glenboro, Holland, Oak Lake, Rivers, Souris, and Wawanesa. The constituency also includes the part of CFB Shilo that is within the Municipality of Glenboro - South Cypress.

The riding's population based on the 2016 census was 22,810.

List of provincial representatives

Electoral results

2011 general election

2016 general election

2019 general election

References

Manitoba provincial electoral districts
Politics of Brandon, Manitoba